Wolfheze is a railway station located in Wolfheze, Netherlands. The station opened in 1845 and is on the Amsterdam–Arnhem railway. The train service are operated by Nederlandse Spoorwegen.

Train services
, the following train services call at this station:
Local Sprinter service: Ede-Wageningen - Arnhem

External links
NS website 
Dutch public transport travel planner 

Railway stations in Gelderland
Railway stations opened in 1845
Railway stations on the Rhijnspoorweg
Buildings and structures in Renkum
Railway stations in the Netherlands opened in 1845